Bhuvan Gowda is an Indian cinematographer who works in Kannada films. He is known for his work in Ugramm (2014), Pushpaka Vimana (2017) and K.G.F film series.

Career 
Gowda began his career as a cinematographer for Prashanth Neel's Ugramm after the main cinematographer left the film. He shot the film with a 5D camera. In 2017, he was the cinematographer for Pushpaka Vimana. His work was well appreciated by critics. He collaborated with Neel again for K.G.F: Chapter 1 after Ugramm. Gowda garnered acclaim for his work in KGF: Chapter: 1 and won the SIIMA Award for Best Cinematographer. For K.G.F: Chapter 1, Gowda carried 40 kilogram camera for every shot and also used a drone. His next work was K.G.F: Chapter 2, where he collaborated with Neel for the third time.

Filmography

References

External links 
 

Living people
Kannada film cinematographers
Indian cinematographers
Telugu film cinematographers
1984 births